Xi is the 14th letter of the Greek alphabet (uppercase Ξ, lowercase ξ), representing the voiceless consonant cluster . In the system of Greek numerals, it has a value of 60. Xi was derived from the Phoenician letter samekh .

Xi is distinct from the letter chi, which gave its form to the Latin letter X.

Greek 

Both in classical Ancient Greek and in Modern Greek, the letter Ξ represents the consonant cluster /ks/. In some archaic local variants of the Greek alphabet, this letter was missing. Instead, especially in the dialects of most of the Greek mainland and Euboea, the cluster /ks/ was represented by Χ (which in classical Greek is chi, used for ). 

Because this variant of the Greek alphabet was used in Magna Graecia (the Greek colonies in Sicily and the southern part of the Italian peninsula), the Latin alphabet borrowed Χ rather than Ξ as the Latin letter that represented the /ks/ cluster that was also present in Latin.

Cyrillic
The Xi was adopted into the early Cyrillic alphabet, as the letter ksi (Ѯ, ѯ).

Mathematics and science

Uppercase
The uppercase letter Ξ is used as a symbol in various contexts.

Pure mathematics 
 Harish-Chandra's Ξ function in harmonic analysis and representation theory
 The Riemann Xi function in analytic number theory and complex analysis

Physics 
 The "cascade particles" in particle physics
 The partition function under the grand canonical ensemble in statistical mechanics

Other uses 
 Indicating "no change of state" in Z notation in computing
 Monetary units of the cryptocurrencies Ether (and less commonly ETC), equal to 1018 Wei

Lowercase
The lowercase letter ξ is used as a symbol for:

Pure mathematics 
 Random variables
 A parameter in a generalized Pareto distribution
 The symmetric function equation of the Riemann zeta function in mathematics, also known as the Riemann Xi function
 A universal set in set theory
 A number used in the remainder term of Taylor's theorem that falls between the limits a and b
 A number used in error approximations for formulas that are applications of Taylor's theorem, such as Newton–Cotes formulas

Physics and astronomy 
 In fluid dynamics, the Iribarren parameter.
 The initial mass function in astronomy.
 The correlation function in astronomy.
 Spatial frequency;  also sometimes temporal frequency.
 A small displacement in MHD plasma stability theory
 The x-coordinate of computational space as used in computational fluid dynamics
 Potential difference in physics (in volts)
 The radial integral in the spin-orbit matrix operator in atomic physics.
 The Killing vector in general relativity.
 Average logarithmic energy decrement per collision (neutron calculations in nuclear physics)
 Pippard's cohesion length in superconductors
 The diameter of a crystal nucleus in nucleation theory
 Microturbulence velocity in a stellar atmosphere
 The dimensionless longitudinal momentum loss of a beam particle after a two-body interaction in accelerator physics.
 Dimensionless distance variable used in the Lane–Emden equation

Other uses 
 Propositional variables in some philosophical works, first found in Wittgenstein's Tractatus
 Extent of reaction, a concept in physical chemistry used often in chemical engineering kinetics and thermochemistry
 Unknown stereochemistry or stereocentre configuration in a planar ring system in organic chemistry, as well as uppercase Xi for unknown R/S/E/Z configuration in general
 One of the two different polypeptide chains of the human embryonic hemoglobin types Hb-Portland (ξ2γ2) and Hb-Gower I (ξ2ε2)
 A parameter denoted as warped time used to derive the equations for homogeneous azeotropic distillation
 State Price Density in mathematical finance
 The information vector in the Information Filter, GraphSLAM, and a number of other algorithms used for robot localization and robotic mapping.
 Used in Support Vector machines in cases where the data is not linearly separable.
 Used in Microelectronics to represent the distance from a p-n junction to a point in the depletion region where the electric field is strongest.

Character encodings

Greek Xi / Coptic Ksi 
Unicode Code Charts: Greek and Coptic (Range: 0370-03FF)

Mathematical Xi 
The following characters are used only as mathematical symbols. Stylized Greek text should be encoded using the normal Greek letters, with markup and formatting to indicate text style.

Other uses

Uppercase Ξ is used as an 'E' to stylise company names/logos like Razer (styled as RΛZΞR), Tesla (styled as TΞSLA), musician Banners (styled as BANNΞRS), and in South Korean boy group ZE:A's newest logo (styled as "ZΞA") (Compare: Heavy Metal umlaut; Faux Cyrillic)

References 

Greek letters